"Farewell to the Master" is a science fiction short story  by American writer Harry Bates. It was first published in the October 1940 issue of Astounding Science Fiction. It provided the basis of the 1951 film The Day the Earth Stood Still and its 2008 remake. In 1973, the story was adapted by Marvel Comics for its Worlds Unknown series with Bates' blessing.

Plot 
The former only manages to state "I am Klaatu and this is Gnut" before he is shot and killed by a lunatic. Klaatu is buried nearby. In the days that follow, Gnut remains motionless, while laboratories and a museum are built around it and the ship. Both prove impervious to the investigations of scientists.

Sutherland discovers that the robot enters the ship each night when no one is watching, emerging to resume its position for the day. Gnut is aware of the reporter, but ignores him. After several odd encounters, Sutherland informs the world what he has learned. Gnut is encased in "glasstex", finally forcing the robot's hand. It breaks out, unaffected by all attempts to destroy it, picks up Sutherland and travels to the mausoleum containing Klaatu's corpse. It opens the tomb and takes a recording of Klaatu's voice stored there. It then returns and goes inside the ship.

Sutherland daringly boards the ship before the entrance closes and learns that the robot is working on a way to create a copy of Klaatu from an audio recording of his greeting. However the new Klaatu is flawed because the recording is imperfect, and he dies soon after speaking with the reporter. Sutherland then suggests retrieving the original recording device to study it and discover how to compensate for its imperfections. Gnut eagerly adopts this idea. Sutherland arranges for the equipment to be brought to it. As the robot prepares to depart, Sutherland impresses upon it the need to tell its master, the Klaatu yet to come, that his death was a terrible accident. Gnut replies, "You misunderstand,  am the master."

Anthologies

"Farewell to the Master" appears in the following science fiction anthologies:

 They Came From Outer Space: 12 Classic Science Fiction Tales That Became Major Motion Pictures, edited by Jim Wynorski
 Isaac Asimov Presents the Great Science Fiction Stories, 1940, edited by Isaac Asimov and Martin H. Greenberg
 Machines That Think: The Best Science Fiction Stories About Robots and Computers, edited by Isaac Asimov, Martin H. Greenberg, and Patricia S. Warrick
 Reel Future, edited by Forrest J. Ackerman and Jean Stine
 Isaac Asimov's Wonderful Worlds of Science Fiction # 9: Robots, edited by Isaac Asimov, Martin H. Greenberg, and Charles G. Waugh
 War with the Robots: 28 of the Best Short Stories by the Greatest Names in 20th Century Science Fiction, edited by Isaac Asimov
 Adventures in Time and Space, edited by Raymond J. Healy and J. Francis McComas

References

External links 
 
 

1940 short stories
Science fiction short stories
Short stories adapted into films
Works originally published in Analog Science Fiction and Fact
Extraterrestrial life in popular culture